The 2022 Campeonato Carioca de Futebol (officially the Cariocão Betfair 2022 for sponsorship reasons) was the 119th edition of the top division of football in the state of Rio de Janeiro. The competition was organized by FERJ. It began on 25 January 2022 and ended on 2 April 2022. 

Fluminense defeated the defending champions Flamengo on aggregate 3–1 to win their 32nd title.

Participating teams

Format
In the main competition, the twelve clubs played each other on a single round-robin. This round-robin was the Taça Guanabara. The last placed club was relegated to the 2022 Série A2. While the top four clubs qualified for the final stage, the next four clubs (5th to 8th places) qualified for the Taça Rio. In the Taça Rio, the 5th-placed club faced the 8th-placed club, and the 6th-placed faced the 7th-placed. In the final stage, the winners of the Taça Guanabara faced the 4th-placed club, while the runners-up faced the 3rd-placed club.

In both of these four-team brackets (the Taça Rio and the final stage), the semifinals and finals were played over two legs, without the use of the away goals rule. In the semifinals of both the Taça Rio and the final stage, the better placed teams on the Taça Guanabara table would advance in case of an aggregate tie. In the finals of both brackets, there were no such advantage; in case of an aggregate tie, a penalty shoot-out would take place.

Taça Guanabara
<onlyinclude>

Taça Rio – Final stage

Final stage

Semi-finals

Group A

Group B

Finals

Torneio Independência
The Torneio Independência was contested by all the teams participating in the Campeonato Carioca except the "Big Four" of Rio de Janeiro (Botafogo, Flamengo, Fluminense and Vasco da Gama). Their standings were based in the results of the Taça Guanabara excluding all the matches played against the Big Four. The top two teams qualified for the 2023 Copa do Brasil, while the winners won the Troféu José Luiz de Magalhães Lins Filho.
<onlyinclude>

Overall table

Top goalscorers

References

Campeonato Carioca seasons
Carioca
2022 in Brazilian football